Walter Krause (14 March 1896 – 28 April 1948) was a German international footballer.

References

1896 births
1948 deaths
German footballers
Association football midfielders
Germany international footballers
SC Victoria Hamburg players
Holstein Kiel players